{{Infobox horseraces
|class         = Listed
|horse race    = Blue Riband Trial Stakes
|image         =
|caption       =
|location      = Epsom DownsEpsom, England
|inaugurated   = 1937
|race type     = Flat / Thoroughbred
|sponsor       = Cazoo
|website       = Epsom Downs
|distance      = 1m 2f 17y (2,027 m)
|surface       = Turf
|track         = Left-handed
|qualification = Three-year-olds
|weight        = 9 st 1 lb<small>Allowances5 lb for filliesPenalties5 lb for Group 1 or 2 winners3 lb for Group 3 or Listed winners</small>
|purse         = £60,000 (2022)1st: £34,026
|bonuses       = Wildcard Derby entry
}}

|}

The Blue Riband Trial Stakes is a Listed flat horse race in Great Britain open to three-year-old horses. It is run over a distance of 1 mile, 2 furlongs and 17 yards (2,027 metres) at Epsom in April.

History
Established in 1937, the Blue Riband Trial Stakes replaced a previous event called the Nonsuch Plate. It was originally contested over 1 mile and 110 yards.

The present system of race grading was introduced in 1971, and the Blue Riband Trial Stakes was given Group 3 status. It was relegated to Listed level in 1986, and it later became an ungraded conditions race.

The Blue Riband Trial Stakes was discontinued for several years in the mid-1990s. It returned in 1997, and from this point its distance was 1 mile, 4 furlongs and 10 yards. It was cut to 1 mile, 2 furlongs and 18 yards in 1999.

The race was renamed the Investec Derby Trial in 2010, when the banking group Investec took over the sponsorship. The race reverted to its original name from the 2018 running.

The event can serve as a trial for The Derby (flat racing's "Blue Riband"). It was upgraded to Listed status again in 2018 and reverted to its original name of Blue Riband Trial.

The last winner of the trial to achieve victory in the Derby was Blue Peter in 1939.

Records
Leading jockey since 1970 (4 wins):
 Pat Eddery – Oats (1976), Lightning Dealer (1985), Eton Lad (1990), Palio Sky (1997)
 Frankie Dettori - Christophermarlowe (2015), So Mi Dar (2016), Cracksman (2017), Crossed Baton (2018)

Leading trainer since 1970 (6 wins):
 John Gosden - Raincoat (2007), Debussy (2009), Christophermarlowe (2015), So Mi Dar (2016), Cracksman (2017), Crossed Baton (2018)

Winners since 1970

Earlier winners

 1937: Printer
 1938: Chatsworth
 1939: Blue Peter
 1940–46: no race 1947: Combat
 1948: King's Counsel
 1949: Grani
 1950: Port o'Light
 1951: Zucchero
 1952: Castleton
 1953: Premonition
 1954: Ambler II
 1955: Sierra Nevada
 1956: Monterey
 1957: Tempest
 1958: Miner's Lamp
 1959: My Aladdin
 1960: Vienna
 1961: No Fiddling
 1962: Cyrus
 1963: The Bo'sun
 1964: Minor Portion
 1965: Cambridge
 1966: Pretendre
 1967: Starry Halo
 1968: Society
 1969: Caliban

See also
 Horse racing in Great Britain
 List of British flat horse races

References

 Paris-Turf:
 Racing Post:

 galopp-sieger.de – Blue Riband Trial Stakes. pedigreequery.com – Blue Riband Trial Stakes – Epsom.''

Flat horse races for three-year-olds
Epsom Downs Racecourse
Flat races in Great Britain
Recurring sporting events established in 1937